Cornelius Huizinga (born October 29, 1953) is a former Dutch-Canadian ice hockey player.

Huizinga competed as a member of the Netherlands men's national ice hockey team at the 1981 World Ice Hockey Championships, and he played for Team Netherlands at the 1980 Winter Olympics in Lake Placid.

References

External links

1953 births
Living people
Amstel Tijgers players
Canadian people of Dutch descent
Dutch ice hockey defencemen
Sportspeople from Sarnia
Ice hockey players at the 1980 Winter Olympics
Olympic ice hockey players of the Netherlands
Ice hockey people from Ontario